Michael George Prendergast (died 1834) was an Irish politician. He was a Member of Parliament from 19 April 1809 to 2 May 1831, representing at various times the constituencies of Westbury, Gatton, Galway Borough and Saltash.

References 

Year of birth missing
1834 deaths
Members of the Parliament of the United Kingdom for English constituencies
Members of the Parliament of the United Kingdom for County Galway constituencies (1801–1922)
UK MPs 1807–1812
UK MPs 1812–1818
UK MPs 1820–1826
UK MPs 1826–1830
UK MPs 1830–1831
Members of the Parliament of the United Kingdom for Saltash